The commune of Nyabitsinda is a commune of Ruyigi Province in eastern Burundi. The capital lies at Nyabitsinda.

References

Communes of Burundi
Ruyigi Province